Möng Kō, also known as 'Mong Kois a village in Tachileik Township, Tachileik District, Shan State. It lies near the National Highway 4 (Burma).

References

Populated places in Shan State